The Chemins de fer de l'État ("State Railways"), often referred to in France as the Réseau de l'État ("State Network"), was an early state-owned French railway company.

History
The company was established by state order of the Third Republic on 25 May 1878 to take over ten small failing railway companies operating in the area between the rivers Loire and Garonne:
, 777 km, opened 1867;
, 495 km, opened 1865;
Compagnie du chemin de fer d’Orléans à Châlons, 293 km, opened 1873;
Compagnie du chemin de fer d'Orléans à Rouen (Réseau de l'Eure), 338 km, opened 1867;
, 185 km, opened September 1875;
Compagnie des chemins de fer de Maine-et- Loire et Nantes, 91 km, opened February 1877; ;
Compagnie du chemin de fer de Bressuire à Poitiers;
Compagnie du chemin de fer de Saint-Nazaire au Croisic;
Compagnie du chemin de fer de Clermont à Tulle;
Compagnie du chemin de fer de Poitiers à Saumur.

Additional acquisitions included:
Compagnie Bordeaux – La Sauve, 29 km, opened May 1873, acquired by CF des Charentes in June 1874, sold to the PO in 1883
Compagnie de la Seudre, circa 50 km, opened 1874, acquired by État July 1880;
Compagnie Barbezieux – Châteauneuf-sur-Charente, opened 1872, acquired by État in 1893;
Compagnie Alais – Rhone – Méditerranée, opened 1882, acquired by État in 1883.

On 18 November 1908, the État absorbed the Chemins de fer de l'Ouest and in 1934 took over the Paris-Orléans (PO) company's lines in southern Brittany. At its greatest extent its operating area comprised all the territory west of a line extending from Dieppe by way of Paris to Bordeaux. On 1 January 1938 the État merged with all the other French railway companies to form the Société Nationale des Chemins de fer Français (SNCF), becoming that company's Région Ouest. The État then took a seat on the SNCF's Board of Directors, as did all the other companies until 1982 when all traces of the constituents of the SNCF disappeared.

Ligne Paris-Bordeaux
One of the PO's flagship lines was Paris-Orléans-Bordeaux. The État wished to create a competing line to the PO's.  The PO line served Tours, Poitiers, and Angoulême, while the État decided to serve Chartres, Courtalain, Saumur, Niort, and Saintes, almost parallel to the competing line.

Thanks to purchases and exchanges made in 1878 with the PO, by 1884, the État operated:
Chartres - Courtalain
Bessé-sur-Braye - Château-sur-Loir
Saumur - Montreuil-Bellay
Montreuil-Bellay - Saint-Jean-d'Angély
Saint-Jean-d'Angély - Saintes
Saintes - Cavignac
Courtalain-Bessé-sur-Braye was opened in 1885 as well as Château-sur-Loir-Saumur-Cavignac. At La Grave d'Ambarès a junction with the PO was built, and État trains linked Paris and Bordeaux on 11 July 1886.

The last line portion was the hardest to build. On 1 July 1893, an extension via Lormont was opened, Three years later, on 1 August 1896 Bordeaux-État was opened, welcoming trains from Paris.

The État's line was 610 km while the PO's was 582 km. These were the only competing lines in France. This lasted until 1938, date of the creation the SNCF, when the PO line was kept.

The Dautry era
Raoul Dautry became managing director of the Etat in 1928. His desires were to reconquer the railway company's clientele, especially due to the popularity of the car.

Dautry began many modernisation projects, including infrastructure, stations and the opening of new lines (mainly Paris-Chartres by Gallardon). The electrification of the Paris-Le Mans line represents the biggest of his constructions, the line was at the time the most modern line in France.

Another one of his influences was the purchase of 600 new passenger cars. 50 of the cars were luxurious cars and were used on the new electrified line.

As early as 1929, the Etat began experimenting with DMUs with a first order of Renault trains. In 1931, an agreement is reached between Michelin and the Etat, authorising trials of the Micheline train. By 1933, the trains were used for expresses between Paris and Deauville.

During the summer of 1937, the French Government ruled in favour of the nationalisation of the French railways. As a sign of disagreement, Dautry resigned, he was later elected into the SNCF's managing council.

Line openings

Locomotives

Notes

References

External links

Advertising bookmarks of the Chemins de fer de l'État